There existed an evolved system of military education in the Soviet Union that covered a wide range of ages. The Soviet Armed Forces had many tri-service educational opportunities as well as educational institutions for the Ground Forces, the Air Forces, and the Navy. The Soviet Border Troops, the KGB and the Internal Troops also maintained service academies.

Overview

Commissioned officers training
Soviet military academies provided higher education to higher officers and officers of specialized kinds of armed force (engineering, medical, etc.). All able-bodied male students of civilian universities and many other institutions of higher education were subject to mandatory training at the military departments within these institutions to become reserve officers (although not all civilian institutions had military departments). Training at military departments of civilian institutions of higher education was mandatory also for all able-bodied female medical students. Soviet professional military education was also available for persons from the Soviet satellite states and from  the perceived Soviet sphere of influence among the Third World countries.

Soviet military education was aimed at training of officer-specialists in narrowly-defined military occupational specialties, and it differed greatly from American military education system in which newly-qualified second lieutenants receive particular specialties in the framework of their "career branch" only after graduation from military academy or ROTC. Students of Soviet civilian universities having military departments could not choose military occupational specialty because each civilian specialty taught by university was attached to particular military occupational specialty taught by military department of the same university by the rector's order, and it also differed from American military education system in which student can choose between available types of ROTC.

In addition, there were 2 other ways to receive officer rank in USSR: junior officers courses and special assessment at the conclusion of conscript service. Junior officers courses were open to persons completed secondary school and finished their military service as conscripts. Persons graduated from civilian institutions of higher education without military departments and drafted into military service as soldier/sailor could pass special exams at the end of their conscript service; such persons were demobbed with officer's rank. Unlike graduates of military schools and military departments within civilian universities, persons who used these ways were promoted to junior lieutenant as first officer's rank, but not lieutenant.

After several years service, officer could get into military academy of branch of service to deepen his military occupational specialty knowledges. Graduates of such academies could be promoted to colonel/captain 1st rank and to appointed to a position of the commander of regiment/first-rate warship.

After graduating from a military academy of branch of service and several years service in relevant positions, an officer could be accepted into the Military Academy of the General Staff of the Armed Forces. This academy trained a highest ranking military officers.

Teaching staff of military academies was prepared in adjunctura established in 1938. Adjunctura was a military analogue of graduate school. Officers enrolled in adjunctura were called adjuncts. They wrote theses in the military field and got academic degree of candidate of military sciences after successful defense. Officer with such degree could be appointed to a teaching position in military academy but also he could continue to serve in military units.

Warrant officers training
Warrant officers schools were established by the Minister of defense Order of 20 December 1980 №365. Only enlisted personnel and non-commissioned officers, finished their military service as conscripts, could be accepted to enter warrant officers schools. The period of training was ten and half months.

Enlisted personnel and non-commissioned officers training
All able-bodied males obtained basic and specialized military training during obligatory 2-3 year male draft. There also existed schools for non-commissioned officers, often part of the draft service for distinguished soldiers, as a step towards the professional military career. Reservists were subject to periodic training exercises of duration 2–6 weeks once in several years.

Military secondary schools and pre-conscription preparatory courses
Suvorov Military Schools for boys of 14-17 (established in 1943) delivered education in military subjects. Nakhimov Naval Schools were similar to the Suvorov ones, specializing in Navy subjects. Civilians could receive military-related training in military-support organizations DOSAAF (initial name was OSOAVIAKHIM).

Under the Ministry of Defense

General Staff of the Armed Forces

Academies
 Military Academy of the General Staff of the Armed Forces (Moscow)
 Military Diplomatic Academy (Moscow)

Institutes
 Military Institute of the Ministry of Defense

Engineering
 Voronezh Higher Military Engineering College of Radio Electronics
 Cherepovets Higher Military Engineering College of Radio Electronics

Special communications
 Shtemenko Krasnodar Military Institute

Specialists
 8th Central Officer Refresher Courses for Officers of Mobilization Bodies of the Armed Forces (Saratov)

Main Directorate of International Military Cooperation 
 Krasnodar Higher Military Aviation School of Pilots 
 Odessa Higher Military Combined Command Engineering School of Air Defense
 Odessa Higher United Military School ?
 Simferopol United Military School (Perevalnoye)
 5th Central Courses for the Training and Improvement of Aviation Personnel (Kant)

Office of the Chief of Space Facilities 
A.F. Mozhaysky Military-Engineering School
Riga Higher Military Political School (one faculty)

Main Political Directorate of the Soviet Army and Navy

Academies 
Lenin Military-Political Academy

Military-Political 
Donetsk Military Political College of Engineers and Signal Corps
Kiev Naval Political College
Lvov Military-Political School
Minsk Higher Military-Political School
Riga Higher Military Political School
Tallinn Higher Military-Political Construction School
Kurgan Higher Military-Political Aviation School
Leningrad Higher Military-Political School of Air Defense named after Yuri Andropov
Novosibirsk Higher Military-Political Combined Arms School named after the 60th anniversary of the Great October Socialist Revolution
Sverdlovsk Higher Military-Political Tank-Artillery School named after Leonid Brezhnev
Simferopol Higher Military-Political Construction School

Under other departments
Military Institute of Physical Culture (under the Sports Committee)
Military Institute of Military Conductors (under the Military Band Service)
Leningrad Higher Military Topographic Command School (under the Military Topographical Directorate of the General Staff)
Military Law Department of the Military Institute (under the Legal Service)

Rear of the Soviet Army

Academies
Military Academy of Logistics and Transport (Leningrad)

Command
Moscow Higher Command School of Road and Engineering Troops (Balashikha)

Rear
Volsky Higher Military School of Logistics
Gorki Higher Military School of Logistics named after Ivan Bagramyan

Engineering
Ulyanovsk Higher Military Technical School named after Bohdan Khmelnytsky

Under the Soviet Army

Combined Arms Institutions

Academies
Frunze Military Academy

Command
Alma-Ata Higher All-Arms Command School
Baku Higher Combined Arms Command School
Far Eastern Higher Combined Arms Command School
Kiev Higher Combined Arms Command School
Moscow Higher Military Command School
Tashkent Higher All-Arms Command School

Tank Forces

Academies 

 Malinovsky Military Armored Forces Academy

Command 
Tashkent Higher Tank Command School
Blagoveshchenskoye Higher Tank Command School
Kazan Higher Tank Command School
Ulyanovsk Guards Higher Tank Command School
Kharkov Guards Higher Tank Command School
Chelyabinsk Higher Tank Command School

Engineering 
Kiev Higher Tank Engineering School
Omsk Higher Tank Engineering School

Rocket and Artillery Forces (GRAU)

Academies 

 Kalinin Military Artillery Academy (Leningrad)

Command 

 Kolomensky High Artillery Command School 
 Leningrad Higher Artillery Command School
 Odessa Higher Artillery Command School 
 Sumy Higher Artillery Command School 
 Tbilisi Higher Artillery Command School
 Khmelnytsky Higher Artillery Command School

Command-Engineering 

 Kazan Higher Military Command-Engineering School
 Saratov Higher Military Command-Engineering School

Signal Troops

Academies 

 Budyonny Military Academy of the Signal Corps

Command 

 Kemerovo Higher Military Command Liaison School
 Novocherkassk Higher Military Command School of Communications (:ru:Новочеркасское высшее военное командное училище связи)
 Poltava Higher Military Command School 
 Ryazan Higher Military Command School of Communications 
 Tomsk Higher Military Command School of Communications 
 Ulyanovsk Higher Military Command School of Communications

Engineering 

 Kiev Higher Military Engineering School of Communications 
 Leningrad Higher Military Engineering School

Engineering Forces

Academies 

 Kuibishev Military Engineering Academy

Command 

 Kamenets-Podolsk Higher Military Engineering Command School
 Tyumen Higher Military Engineering Command School

Engineering 

 Kaliningrad Higher School of Engineering

Chemical Troops

Academies 

 Timoshenko NBC Protection Military Academy

Command 

 Kostroma Higher Military Command School of Chemical Defense
 Tambov Higher Military Command School of Chemical Defense

Engineering 

 Saratov Higher Military Engineering School of Chemical Defense

Air Defence Troops of the Ground Forces

Academies 

 Vasilevsky Military Academy of Army Air Defence Forces

Command 

 Leningrad Higher Anti-Aircraft Missile Command School
 Orenburg Higher Anti-Aircraft Missile Command School 
 Poltava Higher Anti-Aircraft Missile Command School

Engineering 

 Kiev Higher Anti-Aircraft Missile Engineering School
 Smolensk Higher Anti-Aircraft Missile Engineering School

Soviet Airborne Forces

Command 

 Ryazan Guards Higher Airborne Command School

Automotive Troops 

 Ussuriysk Higher Military Automotive Command School (:ru:Уссурийское высшее военное автомобильное командное училище). The school was disbanded in June 2007, and replaced by a centre for the training of automotive service specialists, in turned disbanded 2012. After that the 70th Guards Motor Rifle Brigade (from 2018, 114th Guards MRR / 127 MRD) took over the site.
 Ryazan' Higher Military Automotive Engineering School
 Chelyabinsk Higher Military Automotive Engineering School
 Samarkand Higher Military Automobile Command School

Under the Soviet Air Defence Forces

Academies 

 Zhukov Air and Space Defence Academy
 Govorov Military Radio Engineering Academy

Command 

 Gorky Higher Anti-Aircraft Missile Command School
 Dnepropetrovsk Higher Anti-Aircraft Missile Command School
 Ordzhonikidze Higher Anti-Aircraft Missile Command School
 Engels Higher Anti-Aircraft Missile Command School of Air Defense
 Yaroslavl Higher Military School of Anti-Aircraft Warfare
 Vilnius Higher Command School of Radio Electronics
 Krasnodar Higher Military Aviation School

Command and engineering 

 Zhytomir Higher School of Radio Electronics
 Pushkin Higher School of Air Defense

Engineering 

 Minsk Higher Engineering Anti-aircraft Missile School
 Kiev Higher Engineering Radio Engineering School

Pilots 

 Armavir Higher Military Aviation School of Pilots
 Stavropol Higher Military Aviation School of Pilots and Navigators PVO

Under the Soviet Air Force

Academies 

 Gagarin Air Force Academy
 Zhukovsky Air Force Engineering Academy

Flying and Navigator Schools 

 Balashov Higher Military Aviation School 
 Barnaul Higher Military Aviation School
 Borisoglebsk Higher Military Aviation School of Pilots
 Eisk Higher Military Aviation School
 Kacha Higher Military Aviation School of Pilots
 Krasnodar Higher Military Aviation School of Pilots
 Orenburg Higher Military Aviation School 
 Saratov Higher Military Aviation School
 Syzran Higher Military Aviation School
 Tambov Higher Military Aviation School
 Ufa Higher Military Aviation School
 Kharkov Higher Military Aviation School 
 Chernigov Higher Military Aviation School
 Lugansk Higher Military Aviation School of Navigators
 Chelyabinsk Red Banner Military Aviation Institute of Navigators

Engineering 

 Voronezh Higher Military Aviation Engineering School
 Daugavpils Higher Military Aviation Engineering School
 Irkutsk Higher Military Aviation Engineering School
 Kiev Military Aviation Engineering Academy
 Riga Higher Military Aviation Engineering School
 Tambov Higher Military Aviation Engineering School
 Kharkov Higher Military Aviation Engineering School
 Kharkov Higher Military Aviation School of Radio Electronics

Medium Technical Aviation 

 Achinsk Military Aviation Technical School 
 Vasilkovskoe Military Aviation Technical School
 Kaliningrad Military Aviation Technical School
 Kirov Military Aviation Technical School (Volgograd)
 Lomonosov Military Aviation Technical School (Lebyazhye, Lomonosovsky District, Leningrad Oblast)
 Perm Military Aviation Technical School

Under the Soviet Navy

Academies
 Gretchko Naval Academy (Leningrad)
 Higher Special Officer Classes (Leningrad)

Command
M. V. Frunze Naval College (Leningrad)
Kaliningrad Higher Naval School
Caspian Higher Naval School (Baku)
Pacific Higher Naval School (Vladivostok)
Black Sea Higher Naval School (Sevastopol)
Lenin Komsomol Submarine Navigation Higher Naval School (Leningrad)

Engineering
Dzerzhinsky Higher Naval Engineering School (Leningrad)
"V.I. Lenin" Leningrad Higher Naval Engineering School (Pushkin)
Sevastopol Higher Naval Engineering School
Higher Naval School of Radio Electronics "Alexander Stepanovich Popov" (Petrodvorets)

Secondary and primary vocational education
Auxiliary Fleet (civilian specialists)
Lomonosov Naval School

Under of the Strategic Missile Forces

Academies
 Dzerzhinsky Missile Force Academy (Moscow)

Engineering
 Serpukhov Higher Military Command and Engineering School of Rocket Forces named after the Lenin Komsomol
 Krasnodar Higher Military Command and Engineering School of the Missile Forces
 Perm Higher Military Command and Engineering Red Banner School of Missile Forces
 Rostov Higher Military Command and Engineering School of Missile Forces 
 Kharkov Higher Military Command and Engineering School of Missile Forces
 Stavropol Higher Military Engineering School of Communications named after the "60th anniversary of Great October"

Under the Ministry of Internal Affairs

Internal Troops

Command
Novosibirsk Higher Military Command School of the Internal 
Ordzhonikidze Higher Military Command School of the Internal Troops named after S.M. Kirov
Perm Higher Military Command School of the Internal Troops
Saratov Higher Military Command School of the Internal Troops named after Dzerzhinsky

Rear
Kharkov Higher Military School of Logistics of the Internal Troops

Military-political
Leningrad Higher Political-School of Internal Troops named after the 60th anniversary of the Komsomol

Under the KGB

Dzerzhinsky Higher School of the KGB (Moscow)
Higher Courses of the KGB (Alma-Ata)
Higher Courses of the KGB (Gorky)
Higher Courses of the KGB (Kiev)
Higher Courses of the KGB (Leningrad)
Higher Courses of the KGB (Minsk)
Higher Courses of the KGB of the USSR (Sverdlovsk)
Higher Courses of the KGB of the USSR (Tashkent)
Higher Courses of the KGB of the USSR (Tbilisi)

First Chief Directorate 
Yuri Andropov Institute of the KGB

Third Chief Directorate 
 Courses of Military Counterintelligence (Novosibirsk)

Soviet Border Troops 
 Higher Border Command Courses (Moscow)

Command 
 Higher Border Command School of the KGB named after Dzerzhinsky (Alma-Ata)
 Moscow Border Guards Institute of the Border Defence Forces of the KGB "Moscow City Council"

Military-political 
 Voroshilov Higher Border Military-Political School of the KGB (Golitsyno)

Government Liaison Troops

Command 
 Oryol "Mikhail Kalinin" Higher Military Command School of Communications of the KGB

Under the Ministry of Medium Machine Building
Volga Higher Military Construction Command School (Dubna)

Under the Ministry of Construction in the Eastern Regions
Khabarovsk Higher Military Construction School

Secondary Schools under the Ministry of Defense
Suvorov Military School
Yekaterinburg Suvorov Military School
Kazan Suvorov Military School
Moscow Suvorov Military School
Moscow Military Music College
Leningrad Suvorov Military School
Kalinin Suvorov Military School
Ussuriysk Suvorov Military School
Kiev Suvorov Military School
Minsk Suvorov Military School
Nakhimov Naval School
Nakhimov Naval School (Leningrad)

Secondary schools under the Ministry of Higher Education

The task of these schools were to train future officers from among the Soviet nationalities.

Republican Special Boarding School with in-depth study of the Russian language and enhanced military-physical training named after Hero of the Soviet Union Baurzhan Momyshuly (Alma-Ata)
Republican Special Boarding School with in-depth study of the Russian language and enhanced military-physical training (Ashgabat)
Republican Special Boarding School with in-depth study of the Russian language and enhanced military-physical training (Chisinau)
Republican Special Boarding School with in-depth study of the Russian language and enhanced military-physical training (Lviv)
Republican Special Boarding School with in-depth study of the Russian language and enhanced military-physical training (Riga)
Republican Special Boarding School with in-depth study of the Russian language and enhanced military-physical training (Tashkent)
Republican Special Boarding School with in-depth study of the Russian language and enhanced military-physical training (Tbilisi)
Republican special boarding school with in-depth study of the Russian language and enhanced military-physical training named after the 60th anniversary of the Communist Party of Kirghizia (Frunze)
Special Boarding School with in-depth study of the Russian language and enhanced military-physical training (Baku)
Special Boarding School with in-depth study of the Russian language and enhanced military-physical training (Dushanbe)
Special Boarding School with in-depth study of the Russian language and enhanced military-physical training (Karaganda)
Special Boarding School with in-depth study of the Russian language and enhanced military-physical training (Kryvyi Rih)
Special Boarding School with in-depth study of the Russian language and enhanced military-physical training (Leninabad)
Special Boarding School with in-depth study of the Russian language and enhanced military-physical training (Samarkand)
Special Boarding School with in-depth study of the Russian language and enhanced military-physical training (Tashauz)
Special Boarding School with in-depth study of the Russian language and enhanced military-physical training (Urgench)
Special Boarding School with in-depth study of the Russian language and enhanced military-physical training (Ferghana)
Special Boarding School with in-depth study of the Russian language and enhanced military-physical training (Cherkessk)
Special Boarding School with in-depth study of the Russian language and enhanced military-physical training (Shymkent)

See also
Military academies in Russia

References

Further reading
"The Educating of Armies", by Michael Dawson Stephens (1989)  (about philosophy and practice of the training of soldiers in  Britain, America, Cuba, the USSR, China, Indonesia, Israel and Sweden.)
Christina F. Shelton, "The Soviet Military Education System for Commissioning and Training Officers", a bibliographical description and a link to the document in PDF format

Military education and training in the Soviet Union